Shithead is a derogatory term for a person who is ignorant, narrow minded, cruel or unintelligent. It is generally considered to be a vulgar and profane term.

It may also refer to: 

 Shithead (card game)
 "Shithead", a song by The Haunted found on the album One Kill Wonder
 Shithead, name of a dog owned by Navin R. Johnson (Steve Martin) in the film The Jerk (1979) 
 Joey "Shithead" Keithley, punk musician from the band D.O.A.
 Shithead, a character in the comic book Wanted

See also
 Chicken shit